Dukli is a large village located in the West Tripura District, Tripura, India. The population is 17,306. 8,850 people are male. 7,989 people are female.

References

Villages in West Tripura district